The Drot or Dropt is a river in Nouvelle-Aquitaine, France. It is a right tributary to the Garonne.

Geography 

The source of the Dropt is located near Capdrot in the Dordogne. The drainage basin covers the area between the river valleys of the Lot and the Dordogne.

References

External links 
 valleedudropt

Rivers of France
Rivers of Nouvelle-Aquitaine
Rivers of Dordogne